Van Tomme or Vantomme is a surname. Notable people with the surname include:

André Vantomme (born 1948), French politician
Antoine Van Tomme, Belgian fencer
Maxime Vantomme (born 1986), Belgian cyclist

Surnames of Belgian origin
Surnames of Dutch origin